John Thomas "Sib" Hashian (August 17, 1949 – March 22, 2017) was an American musician, best known as a drummer for the rock band Boston.

Career

Boston
Hashian was chosen by Boston founder and band leader Tom Scholz in 1975 to replace original drummer Jim Masdea when Epic Records demanded that Masdea be replaced for recording. Hashian is heard on Boston's self-titled debut album, as well as on the follow-up Don't Look Back, although the drum parts he played on many tracks were note-for-note transcriptions of Masdea's original drum arrangements. Hashian was involved in the early sessions for Boston's Third Stage album, but was later replaced when Masdea returned.

After leaving Boston, Hashian sued Tom Scholz for back royalties and the two later settled out of court.

Other projects
Hashian was also the drummer for fellow Boston member Barry Goudreau's self-titled solo album which was released in 1980. The album achieved moderate success with the rock radio hit "Dreams".

Boston and the Barry Goudreau album were the last mainstream projects Hashian worked on. He went on to own a chain of tanning salons in Boston, as well as a small record shop.  He occasionally played gigs in the Boston area with former bandmates, including Goudreau, Fran Sheehan, and Brad Delp.

In 2001 he made his first stage appearance as an actor at the Cape Cod Repertory Theater in the world premiere of the play 9-Ball written by his friend Art Devine.

In 2003 he appeared on Sammy Hagar's Live: Hallelujah as an unofficial member of The Waboritas.

In 2004 he returned to the stage at the Tremont Theater for the Boston premiere of 9-Ball which he also produced along with Ernie Boch Jr.

In 2005 he appeared in R U the Girl as his daughter Lauren was a contestant trying out to win the chance to perform with TLC.

In 2006 he recorded with Ernie and the Automatics, a band that featured Goudreau on guitar.

In 2012 he began co-hosting Scorch's PFG-TV, a local TV show in New England, episodes of which were regularly featured on the Opie and Anthony Show, although each segment was centered on mocking PFG-TV's entire show.

Personal life
Hashian was of Armenian and Italian ancestry and lived in Lynnfield, Massachusetts with his wife, Suzanne (née Jipp). They had one son, Adam, and two daughters, songwriter Aja Hashian and singer-songwriter Lauren Hashian, who appeared as a contestant on the reality series R U the Girl in 2005 and has been in a relationship with Dwayne Johnson since 2007. The two were married on August 18, 2019.  Prior to his death, Sib was the maternal grandfather of their two daughters. The Hashian sisters write and produce music together.

Hashian died on March 22, 2017, at the age of 67 of a heart attack, after collapsing in the middle of a set while performing on board of a cruise ship, the Independence of the Seas.

References

External links

1949 births
2017 deaths
Musicians from Boston
Boston (band) members
American people of Italian descent
American people of Armenian descent
American rock drummers
20th-century American drummers
American male drummers
Musicians who died on stage
21st-century American drummers
People who died at sea